Choidoryn Övgönkhüü (10 October 1942 – 2 April 2019) was a Mongolian judoka. He competed in the men's middleweight event at the 1972 Summer Olympics.

References

External links
 

1942 births
2019 deaths
Mongolian male judoka
Olympic judoka of Mongolia
Judoka at the 1972 Summer Olympics
People from Sükhbaatar Province